"Child of Love" is a song by We the Kingdom that was released as the fifth single from their debut studio album, Holy Water (2020), on January 29, 2021. The song was written by Ed Cash, Scott Cash, Franni Cash, Martin Cash, and Andrew Bergthold.

"Child of Love" peaked at No. 5 on the US Hot Christian Songs chart.

Background
We the Kingdom initially released the original version of "Child of Love" on July 3, 2020, as a promotional single from the album, Holy Water (2020). On January 8, 2021, the band released a new version of the song featuring Maverick City Music as part of the deluxe edition of Holy Water.

On January 29, 2021, We the Kingdom released the new version of "Child of Love" featuring Bear Rinehart as a single. We the Kingdom commented on their collaboration with Rinehart, saying: "Bear brought something powerful to this song and it is out of control."

Composition
The singers' vocal range spans from D4 to G5.

Critical reception
Jonathan Andre of 365 Days of Inspiring Media gave a positive review of the song, saying "Bear Rinehart brings another depth and uniqueness to the song, as we see how a little tweak here and there, can elevate a track so high that I reckon this new version, will go farther than the original."

Commercial performance
"Child of Love" made its debut at No. 35 on the US Hot Christian Songs chart dated February 20, 2021, following its commercial release.

Music videos
The official audio video of the song featuring Bear Rinehart was published on We the Kingdom's YouTube channel on January 29, 2021. We the Kingdom released the official music video of "Child of Love" featuring Bear Rinehart on April 9, 2021.

Charts

Weekly charts

Year-end charts

Release history

References

External links
  on PraiseCharts

2020 songs
2021 singles
We the Kingdom songs
Songs written by Ed Cash